Archibald Quincy Jones  (April 29, 1913 – August 3, 1979) was a Los Angeles-based architect and educator known for  innovative buildings in the modernist style and for urban planning that pioneered the use of greenbelts and green design.

Childhood and early career
Jones was born in Kansas City, Missouri, in 1913. He was raised in the city of Gardena in Southern California, but finished high school in Seattle. Afterwards he enrolled in the University of Washington program in architecture, where he was particularly influenced by faculty member Lionel Pries, and graduated with Bachelor of Architecture (B.Arch.) in 1936.

After marrying a fellow architecture student (Ruth Schneider), Jones returned to Los Angeles, working first in the offices of the modernist architects Douglas Honnold and George Vernon Russell from 1936 to 1937, and Burton A. Schutt from 1937 to 1939.

From 1939 to 1940, he worked for the renowned architect, Paul R. Williams. Next he worked for Allied Engineers, Inc. of San Pedro from 1940 to 1942, where he met the architect Frederick Emmons, with whom he would later partner. Jones was responsible for the development and layout of Roosevelt Base in San Pedro and the Naval Reserve Air Base in Los Alamitos.

In 1942, Jones received his California architect certification, divorced and received a commission as a lieutenant commander in the United States Navy. He was assigned to the aircraft carrier USS Lexington, which was serving in the Pacific theater.

Architecture office
Discharged from the Navy in 1945, Jones returned to Los Angeles and opened an architectural office in one of the two buildings of the house in Laurel Canyon he had built with his former wife. On his first day in business Jones had secured his first client.

The years after the war again saw Jones partnering with Paul R. Williams on several projects in the Palm Springs area. These include the Palm Springs Tennis Club (1947), the Town & Country restaurant (1948), and the restaurant Romanoff's On the Rocks (1950). Jones also participated in John Entenza's Case Study House program.

The December 1950 issue of the magazine Architectural Forum featured a "Builder's House of the Year" designed by A. Quincy Jones. The same issue also awarded the innovative Palo Alto building magnate Joseph Eichler "Subdivision of the Year". Eichler then invited Jones to tour the Palo Alto development he had just completed where he suggested to Jones that the Builder of the Year join forces with the Architect of the Year. This relationship continued until Eichler's death in 1974.

It was through this relationship that Jones was provided both the venue and the freedom to implement his concepts of incorporating park-like common areas in tract housing developments. His were some of the first greenbelts incorporated into moderate income tract housing in the United States. In 1960, Jones was hired by William Pereira as a planning partner in the development of the city of Irvine, California, which has since become a model for the integration of greenbelts into urban development.

The Eichler commission prompted Jones to form a partnership with his prewar acquaintance, architect Frederick Emmons. The Jones and Emmons partnership lasted from 1951 until Emmons' retirement in 1969. Their designs are reflected in some 5,000 of Eichler's homes, by Emmons' estimate. Jones and Emmons were awarded national AIA Firm of the Year in 1969.

Teaching and influence
Jones was also a professor and later dean of architecture in the USC School of Architecture at the University of Southern California  from 1951 until his death in 1979. By the 1960s Jones was designing a number of university campus buildings and larger office buildings, including the 1963 IBM Aerospace Headquarters in Westchester, California. Several University of California campuses feature significant examples of Jones' work. In 1966, Jones designed "Sunnylands," the 200 acre (2.6 km2) estate and 32,000 square foot (3,000 m2) home of Walter Annenberg in Rancho Mirage, California.

Jones raised the tract house in California from the simple stucco box to a logically designed structure integrated into the landscape and surrounded by greenbelts. He introduced new materials as well as a new way of living within the built environment and popularized an informal, outdoor-oriented open plan. More than just abstractions of the suburban ranch house, most Jones and Emmons designs incorporated a usable atrium, high ceilings, post-and-beam construction and walls of glass. For the postwar moderate-income family, his work bridged the gap between custom-built and developer-built homes.

Jones often took advantage of industrial prefabricated units to provide affordable yet refined architecture. His larger buildings brought innovations to the integration of mechanical systems, improving their efficiency and maximizing retrievable space. Jones' aesthetic style, precise detailing and siting made his buildings quintessential embodiments of mid-century American architecture.

Legacy
In 2013, a Hammer Museum exhibition entitled "A. Quincy Jones: Building for Better Living," redressed what curators had until then considered a major omission in the history of Los Angeles Modernism. An exhibition catalogue, now out of print, was published at the same time.

Several of his buildings are listed by the Los Angeles Conservancy.

Significant buildings
1938 Jones House and Studio, 8661 Nash, West Hollywood, Los Angeles, California
1947 Palm Springs Tennis Club Addition, with Paul R. Williams. Palm Springs, California
1948
Pueblo Gardens housing development, for developer Del Webb, Tucson, Arizona
The Center, a.k.a. Town & Country Restaurant, with Paul R. Williams. 300 South Palm Canyon Drive, Palm Springs, California. (altered)
Romanoff's on the Rocks, Palm Springs, California  (altered)
Nordlinger House, 11492 Thurston Circle, Bel Air, Los Angeles, California
1950
Brody House, 360 South Mapleton Drive, Holmby Hills, Los Angeles, California
Mutual Housing Association Development (Crestwood Hills), with Smith and Contini. Los Angeles, California
Hvistendahl House, San Diego
Andrew Fuller House, Charron Lane, Fort Worth, Texas
The Barn (Los Angeles) Los Angeles, California
1951 Campbell Hall School, 4717 Laurel Canyon, North Hollywood, California
1952 House, Bienveneda and Marquette Streets, Pacific Palisades, California
1953 House, 503 N Oakhurst Drive, Beverly Hills, California (destroyed by new owner circa 1995.)  (According to Property Shark and several other realty websites, the house at this address was built in 2005, so the new owner either held onto the property for 10 years, or Wikipedia date is incorrect.  According to Jones' collection at UCLA the home was built in 1951.)
1954
Emmons House, 661 Brooktree, Pacific Palisades, California
U.S. Gypsum Research Village House, Barrington, Illinois
1955 Jones House, 1223 Tigertail Road, Los Angeles (destroyed by fire)
1956 Eichler Steel House X-100, San Mateo, California
1957 Lido Sands Development, [Newport Beach, California] (82 houses)
1959 
 Biological Sciences Building, University of California, Santa Barbara
 Trousdale Estates home, Beverly Hills, California
 Matt and Lyda Kahn house, Stanford, California
1960 Faculty Center, University of Southern California Los Angeles, California
1961 Case Study House No. 24, Chatsworth, California (unbuilt)
1963 Shorecliff Tower Apartments (now called Ocean Aire), 535 Ocean Avenue, Santa Monica, California
1964
Joseph Eichler Housing Development, Granada Hills, California
University Research Library, unit I, University of California, Los Angeles, California
Laguna Eichler Apartments, 66 Cleary Court, San Francisco, California
Joseph Eichler Housing Development, Thousand Oaks, California
Long Beach Naval Station Family Housing, Long Beach, California
California State University, Dominguez Hills campus master plan, Carson, California
1965 
University of California, Irvine (partnership with William Pereira)
Country Club Estates, Palm Springs, California
1966
Walter Annenberg Estate "Sunnylands", Rancho Mirage, California
Carillon Tower, University of California, Riverside, California
Edward Chiles Residence, Shady Oaks Lane, Fort Worth, Texas
Faircourt Housing Subdivision, Palo Alto, California
1967 Chemistry Building, University of California, Riverside, California
1971 Research Library, unit II, University of California, Los Angeles, California
1975 Mandeville Center for the Arts, University of California, La Jolla, San Diego, California
1976 USC Annenberg School for Communication and Journalism, unit I, University of Southern California, Los Angeles California
1979 USC Annenberg School for Communication and Journalism, unit II, University of Southern California, Los Angeles California.

References

Further reading

1913 births
1979 deaths
People from Kansas City, Missouri
Fellows of the American Institute of Architects
Modernist architects
United States Navy personnel of World War II
Architects from Seattle
People from Greater Los Angeles
University of Southern California faculty
University of Washington College of Built Environments alumni
Architects from California
20th-century American architects
United States Navy officers